Guillaume Tremblay (born April 14, 1984) is a Canadian politician. Formerly a Parti Québécois member of the National Assembly of Quebec from 2008 to 2012, he is currently serving as the mayor of Mascouche.

Born in Mascouche, Quebec, Tremblay attended the Cégep régional de Lanaudière in Terrebonne and obtained a degree in administration. He was also elected as an independent city councilor in Mascouche in 2005 and served as the director of a local electronic store in Lachenaie.

He was elected to represent the riding of Masson in the 2008 provincial election, defeating incumbent Ginette Grandmont of the ADQ. He did not run for re-election in the 2012 provincial election.

He announced his intention to run for mayor of Mascouche in the 2013 municipal election. He won the election with 53.6 per cent of the vote.

References

External links
 
 Parti Québécois biopage 

1984 births
French Quebecers
Living people
Parti Québécois MNAs
People from Mascouche
Mayors of places in Quebec
21st-century Canadian politicians